Oakville Blue Devils may refer to:

 Brampton United, known as Oakville Blue Devils from 2005 to 2006, Canadian soccer club that played in the Canadian Soccer League
 Blue Devils FC, known as Oakville Blue Devils FC from 2015 to 2020, Canadian soccer club that plays in League1 Ontario since 2015